The McGill International Review (MIR) is an online daily publication based in Montréal, Québec and operated by the International Relations Students' Association of McGill (IRSAM), which provides academic analysis and coverage of world affairs under the aegis of McGill University.  The current editor-in-chief is Emily Jones.

History

Origins
The magazine was established in 2000 as an effort to lead a student-driven force in academia. Toby A. A. Heaps, then vice-president for internal operations within IRSAM, compiled a collection of works by students, professors, and affiliates to produce the first edition, entitled Canada in the World. The magazine sought to establish itself as a neutral forum for university students to express their interest in international affairs. Early contributors included Louise Arbour, former justice of the Supreme Court of Canada and former UN High Commissioner for Refugees, and renowned Canadian historian Desmond Morton.

Restructuring
The structure of IRSAM was changed in 2010; consequentially, the magazine was given more autonomy. Its emphasis shifted from being a space for academic discourse to creating a high-quality research journal by and for the McGill undergraduate community. In 2013, Ameya Pendse, then IRSAM Vice-President of Internal Operations, expanded the publication to include an online platform with the aim of engaging a wider year-round readership, both within and beyond McGill. 2014 saw the introduction of blogs into the online edition, under then Editor-in-Chief Alexander Langer.

Current structure

Print
The print edition has been produced biannually from 2000 to 2010, and annually since 2010. Papers are usually upwards of 2,000 words. Accepted writers, representing all academic disciplines and political persuasions of the McGill community, are paired with an editor. Together, they work on the submission for the duration of the school year. Before publishing, it is peer-reviewed.

Online
The online edition was launched in 2013 under Ameya Pendse, then IRSAM Vice-President of Internal Operations. It maintains a much larger base of writers than the print edition and is updated daily with new articles. The focus of the online edition is to offer fresh perspectives on "hot topics" as well as cover relatively-unexplored subjects and issues, fostering productive discussion and debate on international affairs. The online edition currently offers several other formats, in addition to its feature articles:

(1) The blogs section consists of four to five blogs that are updated regularly. The themes of these blogs are far more specialized and specific than the other parts of the online edition. They are meant to give the readership an opportunity to explore a concerted, direct concentration on a single topic instead of reading a digest.

(2) The media team, meanwhile, regularly produces visual and audio content (teaser videos, short documentaries, podcasts, interviews with high-profile figures in academia, politics and civil society) to complement the work of the feature team and pursue investigative projects on a number of niche issues.

Recent achievements and future 
Under Dylan Lamberti (Editor in Chief, Online) and Miro Guzzini (Editor in Chief, Print), 2016-17 saw an exponential growth in readership, a dramatic increase in high quality submissions, and the production of more professionalized media projects (teaser videos, short documentaries, dynamic interviews with high-profile figures, podcasts, etc.) This team effort earned MIR its first nomination for Publication of the Year by the Student Society of McGill University (SSMU), as well as numerous academic citations.

In 2017–18, Benjamin Aloi (Editor in Chief, Online) and Marie Lemieux (Editor in Chief, Print) assumed independent seats on the IRSAM Board of Directors for the first time in the publication's history, and the two built on last year's tremendous success in consistently delivering excellent critical analysis in international affairs. The team received its second nomination for SSMU Publication of the Year. The executive board of MIR Online included Sarie Khalid (Senior Editor) and Frankie Wallace (Senior Editor).

In 2018–2019, under Marie Fester (Editor in Chief, Print) the MIR Print rebranded, changing its name to Flux: International Relations Review. Now an exclusively online journal, the McGill International Review's executive board has four members: Sarie Khalid (Editor in Chief), Shirley Wang (Senior Editor), Alec Regino (Senior Editor), David Boot (Media Team Director, Fall 2019), and Camille Point (Media Team Director, Winter 2020). With Laura Millo's (French Section Editor) direction, the MIR established its French division to provide insightful analysis of international affairs in French. The MIR won its first SSMU Publication of the Year award in 2019.

In the 2019-2020 publishing year, the McGill International Review was led by an executive board of six individuals: Alec Regino (EIC), Shirley Wang (Managing Editor), Camille Point (Creative and Media Director), Allegra Mendelson (Senior Editor), Helena Martin (Senior Editor), Salomé Moatti (Senior Editor, Fall 2019), and Charles Lepage (Senior Editor, Winter 2020). 2019-2020 saw MIR experience exponential growth in both viewership and in the variety of content published. In the Fall and Winter semesters, MIR oversaw the production of teams specialized in the 2019 Canadian Federal Elections and the 2020 American Democratic Primaries. In November, MIR hosted Rappler journalist Patricia Evangelista to discuss her experience as a trauma journalist in the Philippines. Over the course of both semesters, the podcasting team, led by Media Editor Bilal Virji, published more podcasts this year than any of the other years combined, while the creative team, led by Creative Director Camille Point, published MIR’s first-ever print magazine. For its efforts, MIR won its second SSMU Publication of the Year award in 2020.

References

External links
 Official website

2000 establishments in Canada
Annual magazines published in Canada
Political magazines published in Canada
Student magazines published in Canada
McGill University
Magazines established in 2000
Magazines published in Montreal
Biannual magazines published in Canada